Yelena Vladimirovna Shalamova (born 4 July 1982 in Astrakhan) is a Russian rhythmic gymnast. She won a gold medal at the 2000 Summer Olympics.

References

External links 
 Profile  on sports-reference.com

1982 births
Living people
Russian rhythmic gymnasts
Olympic gymnasts of Russia
Olympic gold medalists for Russia
Gymnasts at the 2000 Summer Olympics
Sportspeople from Astrakhan
Olympic medalists in gymnastics
Medalists at the 2000 Summer Olympics